Thomas Cowart Goolsby (born September 11, 1961) is a former Republican North Carolina State Senator representing New Hanover County.

A graduate of The Citadel and regimental commander of the South Carolina Corps of Cadets, Goolsby served as a Marine Corps officer after college. Governor Jim Martin appointed him counsel to the State Crime Commission before he opened his legal practice, the Goolsby Law Firm, in Wilmington. He is a former chairman of the New Hanover County Republican Party and an adjunct professor of law at Campbell University.

Goolsby earned an M.B.A. from Golden Gate University and his J.D. from the University of North Carolina at Chapel Hill. He is the president of Empowered Investor Inc. However, the investment adviser registrations of Goolsby, his partner James Upham, and the firm were revoked for at least ten years in 2014. Empowered Investor, Upham and Goolsby also were ordered to cease and desist from engaging in any practice involving securities or financial services business in North Carolina. At that time Goolsby claimed that the business was closed. He lives in Wilmington with his wife Rachael and three children, Fleming, Lily, and Alabama.

Political career

Election 2010
Goolsby won the race for District 9 of the North Carolina State Senate in the November 2, 2010 general election. He defeated James Leutze (D) with 57% of the vote.

In polling prior to the election, Goolsby held a significant lead over Leutze. Both candidates campaigned on the need to cut state spending and control taxes.

Campaign contributions
In 2010, Goolsby raised $394,588 in campaign contributions.

Election 2012
Goolsby was unopposed in the Republican primary on May 8, 2012. He faced Democratic nominee Deb Butler in the general election on November 6, 2012.

During the general election campaign, Goolsby was criticized for his support of mandatory, trans-vaginal ultrasounds for women seeking abortions.  Though Goolsby went on to win re-election, Butler's campaign ad on this topic generated national and international attention.

As state senator
Goolsby sponsored legislation that repealed the state's Racial Justice Act, which had prohibited the imposition of the death penalty on the basis of race. As a member of the University of North Board of Governors he favored the re-installation of the controversial statue "Silent Sam" following its toppling by protesters.

Goolsby has penned a number of opinion columns in local newspapers critical of the Moral Mondays protests, calling them "Moron Mondays" and later "Money Mondays", and referring to protestors as "mostly white, angry, aged former hippies."

Goolsby chose not to run for re-election in 2014, and he resigned from the legislature in August 2014, before the expiration of his term. His resignation followed the revocation by the secretary of state of his registration as an investment adviser, and his consent to the order. Clients had reportedly complained about losing money in volatile investments they never wanted.

Committees
Goolsby served as vice chairman of the Senate Judiciary I committee and chairman of both the Joint Legislative Oversight Committee on Justice and Public Safety and the Appropriations Committee on Justice and Public Safety. He chaired interim committees on pharmaceutical liability, retitling of manufactured homes and consolidation of judicial and prosecutorial districts. He was a member of interim committees on government operations, modernization of banking, energy policy and marine fisheries.

External links
 Official Senate Website
 Senator Thom Goolsby: Committees
 Thom Goolsby's official campaign Web site

References

1961 births
Living people
Campbell University faculty
The Citadel, The Military College of South Carolina alumni
Golden Gate University alumni
North Carolina lawyers
Republican Party North Carolina state senators
People from Dothan, Alabama
United States Marines
University of North Carolina School of Law alumni
21st-century American politicians